Slaton Independent School District is a public school district based in Slaton, Texas, United States. In addition to Slaton, the district serves students in rural southeastern Lubbock County and parts of Ransom Canyon. A small portion of extreme northeastern Lynn County lies within the district.

In 2009, the school district was rated "academically acceptable" by the Texas Education Agency.

Schools
 Slaton High School (grades 9–12), 2008 National Blue Ribbon School
 Slaton Junior High School (grades 6–8)
 Cathelene Thomas Elementary School (grades 1–5)
 Austin Elementary School (pre-K–kindergarten)

Notable students
 William John Cox, public interest attorney, author, and political activist; attended Slaton High School, 1956–57

References

External links
 

School districts in Lubbock County, Texas
School districts in Lynn County, Texas